Jim Dolan is a British former slalom canoeist who competed from the mid-1970s to the mid-1980s.

He won a gold medal in the K-1 team event at the 1983 ICF Canoe Slalom World Championships in Meran.

References
Overview of athlete's results at canoeslalom.net

British male canoeists
Living people
Year of birth missing (living people)
Place of birth missing (living people)
Medalists at the ICF Canoe Slalom World Championships